Michael Barrett  (born 1984) is a Canadian politician, who was elected to the House of Commons of Canada in a by-election on December 3, 2018. He represents the electoral district of Leeds—Grenville—Thousand Islands and Rideau Lakes as a member of the Conservative Party of Canada. He won the riding again in the October 2019 federal election, and was re-elected in the September 2021 federal election.

Life 
Barrett was born in Arnprior, Ontario in 1984, attended Algonquin College in Ottawa, and enrolled in the Canadian Armed Forces. Following his service in the Army, he worked as a human resources manager. Before his election to Parliament he served as a municipal councillor in Edwardsburgh/Cardinal for four years.

Barrett was elected to parliament at the 2018 Leeds—Grenville—Thousand Islands and Rideau Lakes federal by-election.

In November 2019 Barrett was appointed shadow minister for ethics. In July 2020 following a letters from Barrett to Ethics Commissioner Mario Dion, investigations were launched into Prime Minister Justin Trudeau and Finance Minister Bill Morneau to examine their conduct in the WE scandal. In November 2021 Barrett was appointed into the Conservative leadership as the Deputy House Leader and a Co-Chair of Question Period Planning alongside James Bezan. During a shadow cabinet shuffle in February 2022, Opposition Leader Candice Bergen named Barrett shadow minister for health. Barrett was also elected vice-chairman of the Standing Committee on Health.

Electoral record

References

External links

Members of the House of Commons of Canada from Ontario
Conservative Party of Canada MPs
Living people
Ontario municipal councillors
People from Leeds and Grenville United Counties
People from Arnprior, Ontario
1984 births